Jon Ola Hauger Norbom (15 December 1923 – 12 April 2020) was a Norwegian economist and Liberal Party politician.

During World War II, in 1942, Norbom was imprisoned for a brief time at Grini concentration camp. Then, in November 1943, he was among the students who were arrested by the German occupying forces in Norway as part of a general imprisonment of all male, non-NS students at the University of Oslo. He was imprisoned in the German concentration camp Buchenwald.

From 1950 to 1952 he was the leader of the Young Liberals of Norway, the youth wing of the Liberal Party. He was State Secretary in the Ministry of Finance from 1967 to 1969, during the cabinet Borten, and became Minister of the Finance in 1972–1973 during the cabinet Korvald. Norbom never held elected political office.

He graduated as cand.oecon. from the University of Oslo in 1949, and studied international economics and European integration at the College of Europe in Bruges 1952–1953. He subsequently worked as a researcher with the National Bureau of Economic Research, the United Nations and the General Agreement on Tariffs and Trade (GATT) during the 1950s and 1960s. He was director in the International Trade Centre Unctad/Gatt 1973–1984, the Permanent Secretary in the Norwegian Ministry of Health and Social Affairs 1984–1993, and member of the United Nations Social Policy Committee 1987–1990.

Norbom died in Suwanee, Georgia in April 2020 at the age of 96.

References

1923 births
2020 deaths
Ministers of Finance of Norway
College of Europe alumni
Norwegian state secretaries
Liberal Party (Norway) politicians
Norwegian economists
Bærum politicians
Norwegian resistance members
Grini concentration camp survivors
Buchenwald concentration camp survivors